Ayvat Bendi Nature Park is a nature park located in Eyüpsultan district of Istanbul Province, Turkey. 

It was established in 2011, and is one of the nine nature parks inside the Belgrad Forest. The protected area is named after the Ayvat Dam, which was built by Ottoman Sultan Mustafa III (reigned 1757–1774) in 1765 on the Ayvat Creek, a tributary of the Kağıthane Creek.

Ecosystem
Flora
Trees in the nature park area are (Quercus vulcanica), sessile oak (Quercus petraea), Turkey oak (Quercus cerris), blackthorn (Prunus spinosa), Oriental beech (Fagus orientalis), sweet chestnut (Castanea sativa), common hornbeam (Carpinus betulus) and common alder (Alnus glutinosa). As shrub and bush species, tree heath (Erica arborea), butcher's-broom (Ruscus aculeatus), blackberry (Rubus), European ivy (Hedera helix), Smilax excelsa, catnip (Nepeta cataria) and aubretia (Aubrieata cultorum) are found.

Fauna
Common mammals of the park are wild boar, golden jackal, deer, roe, fox, wolf, weasel, hare and squirrel. Observed bird species are falcon, hawk, magpie, crow, woodpecker, sparrow, finch and goldfinch.

Access
The nature park can be accessed from the west over Kemerburgaz or from the east over Bahçeköy, Sarıyer. 
City bus lines #42M or #42HM serve Bahçeköy from Zincirlikuyu and Hacıosman respectively, from where a taxi ride is needed.

See also
 Bentler Nature Park
 Falih Rıfkı Atay Nature Park
 Fatih Çeşmesi Nature Park
 Irmak Nature Park
 Kirazlıbent Nature Park
 Kömürcübent Nature Park
 Mehmet Akif Ersoy Nature Park
 Neşet Suyu Nature Park

References

External links
Ayvat Dam Nature Park at YouTube 

Nature parks in Turkey
Protected areas established in 2011
2011 establishments in Turkey
Parks in Istanbul
Eyüp
Belgrad Forest